The Hiranyakeshi river is a left-bank tributary of the Ghataprabha River originating in the western ghats in the Sindhudurg district of Maharashtra.

Etymology 
The river derives its name from the Shri Hiranyakeshi temple. Located inside the temple are caves from where the river originates as a fresh mountain stream. Hiranyakeshi is a sanskrit word which means "one with golden hair" with respect to the goddess Parvati in the temple. The temple itself is supposed to be situated in a "Devrai" or  a sacred groove as is labelled by the locals.

Course 

The river begins in the Hiranyakeshwar temple, a holy shrine dedicated to the goddess Parvati near the hill-station of Amboli. It quickly flows in a north-west direction towards Jakatwadi, a small village next to Amboli. There the river turns right almost at a right angle and begins to flow eastwards similar to most rivers flowing on the Deccan Plateau. It flows underneath a bridge supporting state highway 121, which was named by the British as Victoria Jubilee Bridge. Then on, it takes a north-eastward course till it reaches the town of Ajra in the Kolhapur district of Maharashtra.

2 km before it reaches Ajra, the river plunges over a rocky ledge measuring about 5 metres in height forming the Ramteerth falls.  A tourist spot, the Ramteerth temple of Lord Ram & Shiv, lies on the banks of the river near the falls. A legend says that Lord Ram had been staying here for some time during his Vanvas. The river then crosses underneath a bridge for the second time. It continues its run now along the right side of SH 134 crossing over into the Belgaum district, Karnataka. At the town of Sankeshwar it begins its short south-eastward course before it converges with Ghataprabha river after Hidkal dam and before Gokak falls.

Irrigation 
The government of Maharashtra has constructed two barriers over the river known as the Dabhil weir and the Devarde weir which provide irrigation water to the neighbouring villages.

Ecology 

The area around the river's origin being a sacred groove is protected by the locals. During the monsoon months, fresh rain water transforms the landscape into a lush green oasis with different types of mushrooms which sprout out along its banks. There are also a variety of plants like karvi and malabar melastome.

Water pollution status
Physico-chemical analysis showed that the water of the Hiranyakeshi River was in 2010 mostly within the limits of WHO standards with the exemption of samples taken at Chicalgud because of the addition of domestic sewage and sugar mill effluents.

Places of interest 
 Hiranyakeshwar temple
 Ramteerth temple
 Amboli hill-station

References

Rivers of Karnataka
Rivers of Maharashtra
Geography of Belagavi district
Rivers of India